The Steile Wand (literally "steep wall", or "steep face") is a  hill ridge in the southwestern part of the Harz Mountains in the German state of Lower Saxony.

Geography 
It lies about 3 kilometres northeast of the town of Herzberg am Harz and its north and northwest slopes drop steeply into the valley of the Sieber. Towards the east it transitions into the Höxterberg. The Steile Wand is entirely wooded; on the steep north side with conifers and on the crest of the ridge and its south side with deciduous woods. There is an old quarry on its steep northwest slope.

Sources 
 Topographic map 1:25,000 No. 4328, Bad Lauterberg im Harz

Hills of Lower Saxony
Hills of the Harz
Osterode am Harz